Lieutenant General Reginald Otto  (9 July 1943 – 5 July 2022) was a South African military commander, who held the post of Chief of the South African Army.

Military career 
He joined the South African Army in 1964 after completing his schooling at Trumpsburg High School. After Officer training at the Army Gymnasium he was appointed a 2nd lieutenant in 1 Special Service Battalion. He became Officer Commanding of 1 Special Service Battalion in January 1976. He also commanded the School of Armour from 11 January 1981 to 18 December 1983.

He was promoted to Brigadier and OC Orange Free State Command. He was later promoted to Major general and GOC Eastern Transvaal Command.

Awards and decorations 
General Otto was awarded the following:

See also
List of South African military chiefs
South African Army

References

 

1943 births
2022 deaths
Afrikaner people
Chiefs of the South African Army
People from Krugersdorp